A gang patch in New Zealand refers to the identifying insignia of a street gang. Patches have been linked to intimidation of members of the public by gang members. Gang patches perform much the same identification role as gang colours do in other countries.

Each of the country's gangs has its own forms of insignia, of which the most prominent is often a large symbol, frequently worn by members on their clothing as a symbol of their gang membership. The patch is often seen as being as important to gang members as a military flag is to members of an army group, and any insult to the patch is taken as being an insult to the gang as a whole.

As such, the term has a more general meaning.  Being a "patched" member of a gang is to be a fully initiated member of the gang - and often a ranking member of the gang's structure. The physical patches are highly valued and have been used with some success in negotiations.

Legality

Wanganui District Council legislation 
The explanatory notes to the "Wanganui District Council (Prohibition of Gang Insignia) Bill", a local bill introduced into the New Zealand Parliament by then Whanganui MP Chester Borrows, records that the Wanganui District Council already had an informal policy that prohibited wearing or displaying gang insignia in public buildings. However, as result of attacks on police and the 5 May 2007 murder of two-year old Jhia Te Tua during a drive-by gang shooting, the council sought the legal power to make bylaws that prohibited wearing gang insignia in designated spaces. The bill received Royal Assent on 9 May 2009 and came into force the next day as the Wanganui District Council (Prohibition of Gang Insignia) Act 2009.

Wanganui District Council then passed bylaws banning the wearing of gang insignia, or patches and similar symbols, within parts of their jurisdiction. The ban was tested by judicial review in a hearing before Clifford J in November 2010. The judge reserved his decision.

Government premises 
On 28 June 2012, Rotorua MP Todd McClay, introduced the "Prohibition of Gang Insignia in Government Premises Bill" into the New Zealand Parliament. The stated aim of the bill was to "provide an environment free from gang intimidation" in all Government premises, including schools, hospitals and local authority premises, as well as those of central government. The bill, which had very similar provisions to the Wanganui District Council legislation, received Royal assent on 12 August 2013 and became law as the Prohibition of Gang Insignia in Government Premises Act 2013.

See also

Gang colours
Colours (motorcycling)
Gangs in New Zealand

References

External links
 
 

Motorcycling subculture
New Zealand culture
Patch
Gangs in New Zealand
New Zealand slang